"Ruined in a Day" is a song by English rock group New Order. It was released as the second single from their sixth studio album, Republic, on 21 June 1993. The song also appeared on the group's Best of compilation the following year and on the 2005 chronology Singles.

Music video
The music video for the track depicts the band and their long-standing collaborator Keith Allen immersed in a bizarre game of charades for Hollywood Blockbusters, with a group of Buddhist monks. Allen also directed the promo.

Track listing

 All CD No. 2 tracks remixed by Sly and Robbie and Handel Tucker

Charts

Release history

References

New Order (band) songs
1993 singles
1993 songs
London Records singles
Polydor Records singles
Song recordings produced by Stephen Hague
Songs written by Bernard Sumner
Songs written by Gillian Gilbert
Songs written by Peter Hook
Songs written by Stephen Morris (musician)